In the field of representation theory in mathematics, a projective representation of a group G on a vector space V over a field F is a group homomorphism from G to the projective linear group

where GL(V) is the general linear group of invertible linear transformations of V over F, and F∗ is the normal subgroup consisting of nonzero scalar multiples of the identity transformation (see Scalar transformation).

for some constant . Note that, in this notation,  is a set of linear operators related by multiplication with some nonzero scalar.

If it is possible to choose a particular representative  in each family of operators in such a way that the homomorphism property is satisfied on the nose, rather than just up to a constant, then we say that  can be "de-projectivized", or that  can be "lifted to an ordinary representation". This possibility is discussed further below.

Linear representations and projective representations

which is the quotient by the subgroup  of scalar transformations (diagonal matrices with all diagonal entries equal). The interest for algebra is in the process in the other direction: given a projective representation, try to 'lift' it to an ordinary linear representation. A general projective representation  cannot be lifted to a linear representation , and the obstruction to this lifting can be understood via group cohomology, as described below. 

The group  is the subgroup of  defined as follows:
,
where  is the quotient map of  onto .

We can define a homomorphism  by setting .
,
.

If  is a perfect group there is a single universal perfect central extension of  that can be used.

Group cohomology
The analysis of the lifting question involves group cohomology.

It follows that the 2-cocycle or Schur multiplier  satisfies the cocycle equation

This  depends on the choice of the lift ; a different choice of lift  will result in a different cocycle

This class might not be trivial. For example, in the case of the symmetric group and alternating group, Schur established that there is exactly one non-trivial class of Schur multiplier, and completely determined all the corresponding irreducible representations.

The solution is always a central extension.

First example: discrete Fourier transform

The operator  is a translation, while  is a shift in frequency space (that is, it has the effect of translating the discrete Fourier transform of ).

.

,
where  denotes the image of an operator  in the quotient group . Since  and  commute up to a constant,  is easily seen to be a projective representation.

Explicitly, this means that  is the group of all operators of the form

This group is a discrete version of the Heisenberg group and is isomorphic to the group of matrices of the form

Projective representations of Lie groups

Studying projective representations of Lie groups leads one to consider true representations of their central extensions (see ). In many cases of interest it suffices to consider representations of covering groups. Then by Schur's lemma, the central subgroup  will act by scalar multiples of the identity.
,

The preceding construction is an important source of examples of projective representations. Bargmann's theorem (discussed below) gives a criterion under which every irreducible projective unitary representation of  arises in this way.

Projective representations of SO(3)
A physically important example of the above construction comes from the case of the rotation group SO(3), whose universal cover is SU(2). According to the representation theory of SU(2), there is exactly one irreducible representation of SU(2) in each dimension. When the dimension is odd (the "integer spin" case), the representation descends to an ordinary representation of SO(3). When the dimension is even (the "fractional spin" case), the representation does not descend to an ordinary representation of SO(3) but does (by the result discussed above) descend to a projective representation of SO(3). Such projective representations of SO(3) (the ones that do not come from ordinary representations) are referred to as "spinorial representations."

By an argument discussed below, every finite-dimensional, irreducible projective representation of SO(3) comes from a finite-dimensional, irreducible ordinary representation of SU(2).

Examples of covers, leading to projective representations
Notable cases of covering groups giving interesting projective representations:

 The special orthogonal group SO(n, F) is doubly covered by the Spin group Spin(n, F).  
In particular, the group SO(3) (the rotation group in 3 dimensions) is doubly covered by SU(2).  This has important applications in quantum mechanics, as the study of representations of SU(2) leads to a nonrelativistic (low-velocity) theory of spin.
 The group SO+(3;1), isomorphic to the Möbius group, is likewise doubly covered by SL2(C). Both are supergroups of aforementioned SO(3) and SU(2) respectively and form a relativistic spin theory.
The universal cover of the Poincaré group is a double cover (the semidirect product of SL2(C) with R4). The irreducible unitary representations of this cover give rise to projective representations of the Poincaré group, as in Wigner's classification. Passing to the cover is essential, in order to include the fractional spin case.
 The orthogonal group O(n) is double covered by the Pin group Pin±(n).
 The symplectic group Sp(2n)=Sp(2n, R) (not to be confused with the compact real form of the symplectic group, sometimes also denoted by Sp(m)) is double covered by the metaplectic group Mp(2n). An important projective representation of Sp(2n) comes from the metaplectic representation of Mp(2n).

Finite-dimensional projective unitary representations
In quantum physics, symmetry of a physical system is typically implemented by means of a projective unitary representation  of a Lie group  on the quantum Hilbert space, that is, a continuous homomorphism

where  is the quotient of the unitary group  by the operators of the form . The reason for taking the quotient is that physically, two vectors in the Hilbert space that are proportional represent the same physical state. [That is to say, the space of (pure) states is the set of equivalence classes of unit vectors, where two unit vectors are considered equivalent if they are proportional.] Thus, a unitary operator that is a multiple of the identity actually acts as the identity on the level of physical states. 

In the finite-dimensional case, it is always possible to "de-projectivize" the Lie-algebra representation  simply by choosing a representative for each  having trace zero.

Thus, at the projective level,  descends to a projective representation of the original group .

An important example is the case of SO(3), whose universal cover is SU(2). Now, the Lie algebra  is semisimple. Furthermore, since SU(2) is a compact group, every finite-dimensional representation of it admits an inner product with respect to which the representation is unitary. Thus, the irreducible projective representations of SO(3) are in one-to-one correspondence with the irreducible ordinary representations of SU(2).

Infinite-dimensional projective unitary representations: the Heisenberg case
These operators are defined as follows:

for all . These operators are simply continuous versions of the operators  and  described in the "First example" section above. As in that section, we can then define a projective unitary representation  of :

because the operators commute up to a phase factor. But no choice of the phase factors will lead to an ordinary unitary representation, since translations in position do not commute with translations in momentum (and multiplying by a nonzero constant will not change this). (See also the Stone–von Neumann theorem.)

Infinite-dimensional projective unitary representations: Bargmann's theorem
More precisely, suppose we begin with a projective unitary representation  of a Lie group .

The theorem does not apply to the group —as the previous example shows—because the two-dimensional cohomology of the associated commutative Lie algebra is nontrivial. Examples where the result does apply include semisimple groups (e.g., SL(2,R)) and the Poincaré group. This last result is important for Wigner's classification of the projective unitary representations of the Poincaré group.

The group  is defined as

A key technical point is to show that  is a Lie group. (This claim is not so obvious, because if  is infinite dimensional, the group  is an infinite-dimensional topological group.)

Notes

References

See also
Affine representation
Group action
Central extension
Particle physics and representation theory
Spin-½
Spinor
Symmetry in quantum mechanics
Heisenberg group

Homological algebra
Group theory
Representation theory
Representation theory of groups